William Ralph Boucher Hassell, best known as Bill Hassell, (born 6 June 1943) is an Australian former Liberal Party politician who was Leader of the Opposition in Western Australia during the mid-1980s. He was a member of the Western Australian Legislative Assembly seat of Cottesloe between 1977 and 1990.

Early life
After attending Hale School, Hassell attended the University of Western Australia (UWA), graduating in 1965 with a Bachelor of Laws. He entered legal practice in 1966.

Political career
In 1977 Hassell was elected to the Western Australian Legislative Assembly seat of Cottesloe, representing the Liberal Party.

He was Leader of the Opposition between 1984 and 1986 before being replaced by Barry MacKinnon.

Hassell's subsequent political career saw him serve as deputy mayor on Nedlands Council and in this capacity in November 2019, he stated that “Although I loathe and detest welcomes to the country, I sit through them patiently when we have these ceremonies.”
Seven months later in June 2020, Hassell tendered his resignation as deputy mayor, and from the council.

Political views
Hassell is a monarchist and was a convenor for the Australians for Constitutional Monarchy.

References

1943 births
Living people
Liberal Party of Australia members of the Parliament of Western Australia
Members of the Western Australian Legislative Assembly
Leaders of the Opposition in Western Australia
University of Western Australia alumni
20th-century Australian lawyers
People educated at Hale School
Politicians from Perth, Western Australia
Australian monarchists
Deputy mayors of places in Australia
Western Australian local councillors